The St. Kitts Music Festival is a festival of popular music held annually in June on the Caribbean islands of St. Kitts. The festival was originally called the Shak Shak Festival, and was first held in 1996. The first Festival featured Arrow, Nigel Lewis, Roy Cape Band, Krosfyah, Nu Vybes and the Small Axe Band, as well as the Su Wen-Ching Chinese Ensemble.

2007 line-up
Thursday 21 June 2007 (Soca/Calypso Night)
Alison Hinds
Machel Montano
Crazy and The Lejah Band
Small Axe Band
Better Band
King Konris and Queen Anastasia
Royaltiez Band
Highlights
Friday 22 June 2007 (Reggae/Dancehall Night)
Pan Tribute to the Boots (The man that introduced Steel Pan to St. Kitts)
Pluto Shervington
Tessanne Chin
Richie Stephens
Lady Saw
Steel Pulse
Sean Paul
Highlights

Saturday 23 June 2007 (R&B/Hip hop and Soul)
Jazzique

2008 line-up
The 2008 St. Kitts Music Festival will take place at Warner Park on the island of St. Kitts  from June 26 to 28, 2008. All concerts begin at 8:00 p.m. Admission is EC $135 or US$50 per night.

Thursday, June 26

Kassav
Calypso Rose
Shadow
El-A-Kru Featuring Tizzy
Roy Cape All Stars
Shurwayne Winchester
The Grandmasters Band
Nu Vybes Band International

Friday, June 27

Billy Ocean
Macka Diamond
Pluto Shervington
Ernie Smith
Boris Gardiner
Pressure
Busy Signal
Mykal Somer
Kasanova Band

Saturday, June 28

John Legend
Ja Rule
Mario
Russell Thompkins, Jr. and the New Stylistics
Kenrick Georges and the Bits & Pieces
Paul Peress All Stars
Brenda Russell
Phil Perry
Tom Scott
Tah Mac
Maxi Priest
Ne-Yo
Michael Bolton
Big Boi

References

External links
St. Kitts Music Festival website

Music festivals in Saint Kitts and Nevis
1996 establishments in Saint Kitts and Nevis